Meré is a village (and also a parroquia) in the concejo of Llanes, in Asturias.  Its population in 2004 was 175, in 84 dwellings.

It can also be reached from Llanes by taking the road that passes El Mazuco.

During and after the Battle of El Mazuco in 1937 it was the headquarters of the Republican forces; see El Mazuco (La defensa imposible).  Almost the entire village was burned to the ground during the war, and had to be rebuilt.  However, the Palacio de Meré survived; it was built in the 18th century alongside a smaller and older building.

Meré's main Fiesta is on 31 October; Nuestra Señora del Rosario.

References

See also 
 Méré (disambiguation)
 Mere (disambiguation), a lake, or a place in England.

Parishes in Llanes